XIT (Crossing of Indian Tribes) is a Native American rock band that released two albums in the 1970s on the  Rare Earth label. The band had previously released an LP as "Lincoln Street Exit" on the Mainstream label in early 1970. They also released many later albums in the 2000's.

History
XIT, originally based in Albuquerque, New Mexico was founded by A. Michael Martinez (singer and lead guitar on Plight), Mac Suazo (narrator and bass on Plight), Lee Herrerra (drums on Plight), and R. C. Gariss (2nd lead guitar on Plight). The most recent members of XIT were, Willie Bluehouse Johnson (Lead guitar) P.J. West (Drums, percussion to include timpani), Louie Running Wolf (bass guitar) and  Jim Boyd (lead guitar). Original Xit has released 6 CDs since 2006, "eXit From the REZ" (2006), "No eXit" (2007), "eXit nOw" (2008), "neXt eXit" (2009), "The Red Album" (2010) and "Forty Years" (2011). Obie Sullivan played keyboards 1971-1975. 

"XIT" stands for "crossing of Indian Tribes", according to Tom Bee. Their music often addresses themes of historic and contemporary Native American issues. Their initial recording, 1972's Plight of the Redman, is a concept album about the changes in Native American life since the arrival of Columbus.

Albums
Plight of the Redman, 1972 (Rare Earth 536)
Silent Warrior, 1973 (Rare Earth 545)
Entrance, 1974 (early work from the sixties as Lincoln Street Exit) (Canyon 7114)
Backtrackin''', 1976 (Canyon 7115)Relocation, 1977 (Canyon 7121)Drums Across the Atlantic, 1985 (Recorded February 6, 1981 - The Tropica Club, Luzern, Switzerland) (Commander 39003)Without Reservation, 2002 (SOAR)eXit From the REZ, 2006No eXit, 2007eXit nOw, 2008neXt eXit, 2009Wanted Alive, 2009The Red Album, 2010 Forty Years'', 2011

References

External links
Tom Bee's Sound of America Records
[ XIT on Allmusic.com]

Native American musical groups
Rock music groups from New Mexico
Culture of Albuquerque, New Mexico